Trial by Combat (US title: Dirty Knights' Work) is a 1976 British action adventure comedy film directed by Kevin Connor and starring John Mills and Donald Pleasence.

Plot
A British organisation known as the Knights of Avalon is discontent that so many criminals can evade the law. So they decide to secretly hunt down these criminals, and battle and execute them with medieval weapons.

One day the founder of the organisation, Sir Edward Gifford, witnesses their actions, and they execute him too. His son, Sir John Gifford, decides to investigate his father's murder.

Cast
 John Mills as Colonel Bertie Cook
 Donald Pleasence as Sir Giles Marley
 Barbara Hershey as Marion Evans
 David Birney as Sir John Gifford
 Margaret Leighton as Ma Gore
 Peter Cushing as Sir Edward Gifford  
 Brian Glover as Sidney Gore  
 John Savident as Police Commissioner Oliver Griggs  
 John Hallam as Sir Roger  
 Keith Buckley as Herald  
 Neil McCarthy as Ben Willoughby  
 Thomas Heathcote as Tramp  
 Bernard Hill as 'Blind' Freddie
 Diane Langton - Ruby 
 Roy Holder - William Renfield

References

External links

1976 films
Films directed by Kevin Connor
British action films
1970s action films
British serial killer films
British vigilante films
1970s English-language films
1970s British films